The Germany men's national ball hockey team is the men's national ball hockey team of Germany, and a member of the International Street and Ball Hockey Federation (ISBHF).

World Championships

External links 
 ISBHF Official Site

Ball hockey
Men's sport in Germany
National sports teams of Germany